Players and pairs who neither have high enough rankings nor receive wild cards may participate in a qualifying tournament held one week before the annual Wimbledon Tennis Championships.

Seeds

  Kevin Kim (qualified)
  Kenneth Carlsen (qualifying competition)
  Ramón Delgado (qualifying competition)
  Bobby Reynolds (first round)
  Michael Berrer (qualified)
  Frank Dancevic (qualified)
  Alejandro Falla (qualified)
  Łukasz Kubot (second round)
  Paul Capdeville (first round)
  Kristian Pless (qualified)
  Rik de Voest (first round)
  Stefano Galvani (qualified)
  Jean-Christophe Faurel (qualifying competition, lucky loser)
  Flavio Cipolla (qualifying competition)
  Lars Burgsmüller (second round, retired)
  Ilija Bozoljac (second round)
  Olivier Patience (second round)
  George Bastl (qualifying competition)
  Diego Hartfield (qualifying competition)
  Zack Fleishman (qualifying competition)
  Alex Bogomolov Jr. (first round)
  Gilles Elseneer (second round)
  Santiago González (second round)
  Peter Luczak (second round)
  Tomáš Cakl (first round)
  Antony Dupuis (first round, retired)
  Roko Karanušić (qualified)
  Nicolas Devilder (first round)
  Jérôme Haehnel (second round)
  Dudi Sela (first round)
  Irakli Labadze (qualified)
  Simone Bolelli (qualifying competition)

Qualifiers

  Kevin Kim
  Irakli Labadze
  Roko Karanušić
  Marcel Granollers
  Michael Berrer
  Frank Dancevic
  Alejandro Falla
  Simon Stadler
  Alexander Peya
  Kristian Pless
  Josh Goodall
  Stefano Galvani
  Wayne Arthurs
  Benedikt Dorsch
  Robert Kendrick
  Benjamin Becker

Lucky loser
  Jean-Christophe Faurel

Qualifying draw

First qualifier

Second qualifier

Third qualifier

Fourth qualifier

Fifth qualifier

Sixth qualifier

Seventh qualifier

Eighth qualifier

Ninth qualifier

Tenth qualifier

Eleventh qualifier

Twelfth qualifier

Thirteenth qualifier

Fourteenth qualifier

Fifteenth qualifier

Sixteenth qualifier

External links

 2006 Wimbledon Championships – Men's draws and results at the International Tennis Federation

Men's singles qualifying
2006